Kenneth Robert James Bingham (born 20 September 1980), known as Kenny Bingham, is a former English cricketer and rugby union player.  Bingham was a right-handed batsman who played primarily as a wicketkeeper. As a rugby player he played mostly on the wing.

Bingham was born in Oxford, Oxfordshire, and went to St Edward’s and Loughborough University.

Bingham represented the Kent Cricket Board in 2 List A matches.  These came against Hampshire in the 2002 Cheltenham & Gloucester Trophy and the Leicestershire Cricket Board in the 2nd round of the 2003 Cheltenham & Gloucester Trophy which was held in 2002.

Bingham played both sports for a number of years before deciding to concentrate on Rugby Union, representing The Barbarians, England Counties, Richmond and Newbury.

References

External links

1980 births
Living people
Cricketers from Oxford
English cricketers
Kent Cricket Board cricketers
Wicket-keepers